Khvorshidabad (also Romanized as Khvorshīdābād, Khowrshīdābād, and Khowrshīdābād) is a village in Allahabad Rural District, Zarach District, Yazd County, Yazd Province, Iran. At the 2006 census, its population was 9, in 4 families.

References 

Populated places in Yazd County